The Old Dominion Limestone is a geologic formation in Washington (state). It preserves fossils dating back to the Cambrian period.

See also

 List of fossiliferous stratigraphic units in Washington (state)
 Paleontology in Washington (state)

References
 

Cambrian geology of Washington (state)
Cambrian southern paleotropical deposits